Ursula Helmhold (born 26 April 1966 in Recklinghausen) is a German politician for the Alliance '90/The Greens. She was elected to the Lower Saxon Landtag in 2003, and has been re-elected on one occasion.

References

1966 births
Living people
Alliance 90/The Greens politicians
Members of the Landtag of Lower Saxony
Women members of State Parliaments in Germany
21st-century German women politicians